Trey Edward Shults (born October 6, 1988) is an American film director, producer, writer, and actor. He is best known as the director and writer of the drama Krisha (2015), the psychological horror film It Comes at Night (2017), and drama Waves (2019).

Life and career
Shults was born in Montgomery, Texas, the son of Robyn (Fairchild) and William Shults.

In 2010, he made his directorial debut in the short film Mother and Son, which he also wrote, edited, and produced. It starred Krisha Fairchild and Lucas Quintana. In 2011 and 2012, Shults variously served as film loader, post-production intern, and intern, on three of Terrence Malick's films, Song to Song, Voyage of Time, and The Tree of Life. At the time, Shults was a business management student but dropped out to work on films and study films himself. In 2011, Shults wrote, directed, produced, and edited, a short film starring Fairchild, titled Two to One.

In 2014, Shults directed, wrote, produced, edited, and appeared in Krisha, a short film starring Fairchild, Robyn, and Billie Fairchild, all of whom are related to Shults. The following year, he directed, wrote, and acted in a feature-length adaptation of the same name, which premiered at South by Southwest in March 2015, winning the Grand Jury Award. The film is based upon a real-life incident involving Shults's cousin, who experienced a relapse at a family reunion. It was acquired by A24 and released in 2016.

In March 2015, Shults signed with William Morris Endeavor. Shults also served as the camera PA on the 2016 film Midnight Special.

A24 also released Shults's 2017 psychological horror film, It Comes at Night, starring Joel Edgerton. His most recent film is the critically acclaimed drama Waves, which was released on November 15, 2019.

Filmography
Short films

Feature films

References

External links
 

1988 births
Living people
21st-century American male writers
21st-century American screenwriters
American film editors
American male film actors
American male screenwriters
Film directors from Texas
People from Montgomery, Texas
Screenwriters from Texas